The 2003 Air Canada Cup was Canada's 25th annual national midget 'AAA' hockey championship, played April 21–27, 2003 at the Sault Memorial Gardens in Sault Ste. Marie, Ontario.  The Calgary Northstars defeated the Gaulois du Collège Antoine-Girouard 5-1 in the gold medal game to win the national title.  It also marked the last season that the midget championship was known as the Air Canada Cup; it would be renamed the Telus Cup.

Future National Hockey League players competing in this tournament were Kris Letang, Jay Beagle, Colin Greening, and Teddy Purcell, who was named the most valuable player of the tournament.

Teams

Round robin

Standings

Scores

Collège Antoine-Girouard 7 - Calgary 0
Yorkton 4 - St. John's 0
Waterloo 4 - Sault Ste Marie 3
Calgary 4 - Waterloo 3
Collège Antoine-Girouard 7 - Yorkton 3
St. John's 6 - Sault Ste. Marie 2
Collège Antoine-Girouard 2 - St. John's 1
Yorkton 2 - Waterloo 1
Calgary 6 - Sault Ste. Marie 2
Calgary 2 - Yorkton 1
St. John's 4 - Waterloo 3
Collège Antoine-Girouard 2 - Sault Ste. Marie 0
Collège Antoine-Girouard 5 - Waterloo 2
Yorkton 5 - Sault Ste. Marie 3
Calgary 4 - St. John's 0

Playoffs

Semi-finals
Collège Antoine-Girouard 3 - St. John's 2
Calgary 2 - Yorkton 1

Bronze-medal game
St. John's 5 - Yorkton 4

Gold-medal game
Calgary 5 - Collège Antoine-Girouard 1

Individual awards
Most Valuable Player: Ted Purcell (St. John's)
Top Scorer: Mathieu Aubin (Collège Antoine-Girouard)
Top Forward: Alexandre Imbeault (Collège Antoine-Girouard)
Top Defenceman: Dustin Nehring (Yorkton)
Top Goaltender: Justin Mzarek (Yorkton)
Most Sportsmanlike Player: Justin St. Louis (Calgary)

See also
Telus Cup

References

External links
2003 Air Canada Cup Home Page
Hockey Canada-Telus Cup Guide and Record Book

Telus Cup
Air Canada Cup
Sport in Sault Ste. Marie, Ontario
April 2003 sports events in Canada
Ice hockey competitions in Ontario
2003 in Ontario